Quesnell Heights is a neighbourhood in west Edmonton, Alberta, Canada. It is bounded by the Rio Terrace neighbourhood across 149 Street to the west, Whitemud Drive to the north and east, the North Saskatchewan River valley to the south, Quesnell Heights is also the smallest neighbourhood in Edmonton. 

The community is represented by the Rio Terrace Community League, established in 1960, which maintains a community hall, outdoor rink and tennis courts located at 155 Street and 76 Avenue.

History 
Approximately 83% of construction in Quesnell Heights occurred during the 1960s with most of the remainder occurring during the 1970s.

Demographics 

Transportation 
Vehicle access to Quesnell Heights is limited to the 156 Street overpass over Whitemud Drive and the 159 Street interchange along Whitemud Drive via Rio Terrace and Patricia Heights to the west.

The Edmonton Transit Service provides bus service to the neighbourhood via 76 Avenue to the west through Rio Terrace.

Pedestrian access to the neighbourhood is available from Laurier Heights via a pedestrian bridge over the Whitemud Drive.

Amenities 

Quesnell Park, one hectare in size, is located near the geographic centre of the neighbourhood between Quesnell Road and Quesnell Crescent.

Housing 
In 2005, all of the 118 dwelling units in Quesnell Heights were single-family dwellings, of which only one was occupied by a renter.

Surrounding neighbourhoods

See also 
 Edmonton Federation of Community Leagues

References 

Neighbourhoods in Edmonton